Simon Mario Kassianides is an English actor, film director, producer and screenwriter.

Early life

Kassianides was born in London, of Greek Cypriot origin, the son of Helen and Mario Kassianides, both business owners. Kassianides has an older brother, Photis Kassianides, who works in finance.

Kassianides was brought up in Clapham and educated at Dulwich College. At the University of Edinburgh he was the producer and executive producer of a sold out run of Grease at the George Square theatre. Profits were donated to the Macmillan Cancer Support.

Career

In 2002, soon after Kassianides graduated with honours in International Business with Finance and while in London helping his mother open Urban Coffee, a fair trade and organic coffee shop in Tooting Broadway, he was spotted by BAFTA award-winning producer Piers Vellacott. 

Kassianides started a course at London's Central School of Speech and Drama but had to leave after being offered a role in the Tennessee Williams' play Night of the Iguana. His performance as Pedro was acclaimed by critics.

Soon after, Kassianides was noted as an actor to watch in a BBC documentary called Making it at Holby. 

Since then, Kassianides has appeared in a number of television episodes in the USA and UK, including Casualty, My Life in Film, Plane Spotting, Ultimate Force, Spooks, Recovery, Holby Blue, Suburban Shootout, The Kylie Show, Ashes to Ashes, The Passion, The Fixer, Love Soup, Hustle, Law and Order UK, Nikita, Burn Notice, and Agents of S.H.I.E.L.D.

Kassianides has also appeared in several international films such as The Edge of Love, Wuthering Heights, Between Two Fires, Quantum of Solace and Smooch.

In 2010, Kassianides produced, directed and starred in Geezas, a film he completed in record time and within budget. The film made the official selection of the 2012 Hollywood Film Festival, selling out The Arclight Movie Theatre in Hollywood at its premiere. In 2012 Simon Kassianides was nominated as a Discovery Director to watch at the Hollywood Film Festival for 'Geezas'  In 2013 Geezas won 'Best Actor' and 'Best Supporting Actress' at the 2013 British Independent Film Festival. Kassianides directed first time actors who won against the likes of Martin Freeman (The Hobbit) and Anne-Marie Duff (Nowhere Boy) 

His work rate and ethic was spotted by the administrators of Michael Cacoyannis Foundation, which was created by Michael Cacoyannis - Director of ‘Zorba the Greek’.

The Michael Cacoyannis Foundation was created to help and promote Greek artists. In 2012 Kassianides was appointed a Global Consultant and Representative of the MCF.

Filmography

References

External links

English male television actors
Living people
English people of Greek Cypriot descent
English male film actors
1979 births
People from Clapham
People educated at Dulwich College
Alumni of the University of Edinburgh
Male actors from London
21st-century English male actors